Julie Ashton-Lucy (born 29 November 1965) is an international field hockey umpire from Queensland, Australia. She was honored as Hockey Australia 2005 Official of the Year.

She has umpired at 2002 and 2006 Commonwealth Games, the 2002, 2006 and 2010 Hockey World Cup, as well as the 2004, 2008 and 2012 Summer Olympics, where she umpired the final of the 2012 tournament.

On 13 September 2000, Ashton-Lucy was awarded the Australian Sports Medal.

References

External links
 Hockey Australia website
 Melbourne 2006 Commonwealth games website

1965 births
Living people
Women's field hockey umpires
Australian field hockey umpires
Recipients of the Australian Sports Medal
Australian female field hockey players
Australian women referees and umpires
20th-century Australian women